Dova may refer to:
 Dua, a Muslim prayer
 Dimitra Dova, Greek sprinter
 Francisco Dova, Argentine sprinter

See also 
 Dova Haw, an island in England
 Dova DV-1 Skylark, a light aircraft
 Dova Superiore, a frazione in Italy